Vikas Hathwala (born 6 September 1993) is an Indian cricketer who plays for Services. He made his first-class debut on 22 October 2015 in the 2015–16 Ranji Trophy.

References

External links
 

1993 births
Living people
Indian cricketers
Services cricketers
Cricketers from Delhi